Iceland participated in the Eurovision Song Contest 2019 with the song "" written by Einar Hrafn Stefánsson, Klemens Nikulásson Hannigan and Matthías Tryggvi Haraldsson. The song was performed by the group Hatari. The Icelandic entry for the 2019 contest in Tel Aviv, Israel was selected through the national final  2019, organised by the Icelandic broadcaster  (RÚV). The selection consisted of two semi-finals and a final, held on 9 February, 16 February and 2 March 2019, respectively. Five songs competed in each semi-final with the top two as selected by a public televote alongside a jury wildcard advancing to the final. In the final, the winner was selected over two rounds of voting: the first involved a 50/50 combination of jury voting and public televoting, which reduced the five competing entries to two superfinalists and the second round selected the winner exclusively through public televoting. "" performed by Hatari emerged as the winner after gaining 57.71% of the public vote.

Iceland was drawn to compete in the first semi-final of the Eurovision Song Contest which took place on 14 May 2019. Performing during the show in position 13, "" was announced among the top 10 entries of the first semi-final and therefore qualified to compete in the final on 18 May. It was later revealed that the Iceland placed third out of the 17 participating countries in the semi-final with 221 points. In the final, Iceland performed in position 14 and placed tenth out of the 26 participating countries, scoring 232 points.

Background 

Prior to the 2019 contest, Iceland had participated in the Eurovision Song Contest thirty-one times since its first entry in 1986. Iceland's best placing in the contest to this point was second, which it achieved on two occasions: in 1999 with the song "All Out of Luck" performed by Selma and in 2009 with the song "Is It True?" performed by Yohanna. Since the introduction of a semi-final to the format of the Eurovision Song Contest in 2004, Iceland has, to this point, failed to qualify to the final seven times. In 2018, Iceland failed to qualify to the final with the song "Our Choice" performed by Ari Ólafsson.

The Icelandic national broadcaster,  (RÚV), broadcasts the event within Iceland and organises the selection process for the nation's entry. Despite calls to boycott the contest due to the ongoing Israeli–Palestinian conflict, which included a petition that collected over 27,000 signatures, RÚV confirmed their intentions to participate at the 2019 Eurovision Song Contest on 13 September 2018. Since 2006, Iceland has used a national final to select their entry for the Eurovision Song Contest, a method that continued for their 2019 participation.

Before Eurovision

Söngvakeppnin 2019
 2019 was the national final format developed by RÚV in order to select Iceland's entry for the Eurovision Song Contest 2019. The semi-finals and final were broadcast on RÚV and online at the broadcaster's official website ruv.is.

Format
Ten songs in total competed in Söngvakeppnin 2019 where the winner was determined after two semi-finals and a final. Five songs competed in each semi-final on 9 and 16 February 2019. The top two songs from each semi-final, as determined by public televoting qualified to the final which took place on 2 March 2019. A jury also selected a wildcard act for the final out of the remaining non-qualifying acts from both semi-finals. The winning entry in the final was determined over two rounds of voting: the first to select the top two via 50/50 public televoting and jury voting and the second to determine the winner with 100% televoting. All songs were required to be performed in Icelandic during the semi-final portion of the competition. In the final, the song was required to be performed in the language that the artist intended to perform in at the Eurovision Song Contest in Tel Aviv. In addition to selecting the Icelandic entry for Eurovision, a monetary prize of one million Icelandic króna was awarded to the songwriters responsible for the winning entry.

Competing entries 
On 20 September 2018, RÚV opened the submission period for interested songwriters to submit their entries until the deadline on 22 October 2018. Songwriters were required to be Icelandic, possess Icelandic citizenship or have permanent residency in Iceland between 1 September 2018 and 19 May 2019. However, exceptions would be made for minor collaborations with foreign songwriters as long as two-thirds of the composition and half of the lyrics are by Icelandic composers/lyricists. Composers had the right to submit up to two entries, while lyricists could contribute to an unlimited amount of entries. At the close of the submission deadline, 132 entries were received. A total of ten entries were selected from the submissions by a seven-member selection committee formed under consultation with the Association of Composers (FTT) and the Icelandic Musicians' Union (FÍH), as well as from entries created by composers invited by RÚV for the competition. The ten competing artists and songs were revealed and presented by the broadcaster during the television programme  on 26 January 2019. Among the competing artists are previous Icelandic Eurovision entrants Friðrik Ómar, who represented Iceland in 2008 as member of Euroband, and Hera Björk, who represented Iceland in 2010.

Shows

Semi-finals
The two semi-finals took place on 9 and 16 February 2019. In each semi-final five acts presented their entries, and the top two entries voted upon solely by public televoting proceeded to the final. "" performed by Kristina Skoubo Bærendsen was awarded the jury wildcard and also proceeded to the final. The second semi-final also featured a guest performance by Bríet who covered the 2012 Eurovision winning entry "Euphoria".

Final 
The final took place on 2 March 2019 where the five entries that qualified from the preceding two semi-finals competed. In the semi-finals, all competing entries were required to be performed in Icelandic; however, entries competing in the final were required to be presented in the language they would compete with in the Eurovision Song Contest. Two entries remained in Icelandic ("" performed by Friðrik Ómar and "" performed by Hatari), while the other three entries competed in English. In the first round of voting, votes from a ten-member international and Icelandic jury panel (50%) and public televoting (50%) determined the top two entries. The top two entries advanced to a second round of voting, the superfinal, where the winner, "" performed by Hatari, was determined by aggregating the televotes from the first round to the televotes of the second.

The jury panel that voted in the first round consisted of:

 Anders M. Tangen (Norway) – television and radio host
 Birgit Simal (Belgium) – television producer
 Eleni Foureira (Greece) – singer, dancer, 2018 Cypriot Eurovision entrant
 Jan Bors (Czech Republic) – Eurovision Head of Delegation
  (Sweden) – music consultant
 Konstantin Hudov (Azerbaijan) – Eurovision Head of Press for the Delegation
 Haraldur Freyr Gíslason (Iceland) – musician, member of the band and 2014 Icelandic Eurovision entrant Pollapönk
 Molly Plank (Denmark) – Eurovision Head of Delegation
 Sigríður Thorlacius (Iceland) – singer, composer, member of the band Hjaltalín
 Þorsteinn Hreggviðsson (Iceland) – program director for Rás 2

In addition to the performances of the competing artists, the interval acts featured guest performances by 2018 Icelandic Eurovision entrant Ari Ólafsson, and Eleni Foureira.

At Eurovision 
According to Eurovision rules, all nations with the exceptions of the host country and the "Big Five" (France, Germany, Italy, Spain and the United Kingdom) are required to qualify from one of two semi-finals in order to compete for the final; the top ten countries from each semi-final progress to the final. The European Broadcasting Union (EBU) split up the competing countries into six different pots based on voting patterns from previous contests, with countries with favourable voting histories put into the same pot. On 28 January 2019, a special allocation draw was held which placed each country into one of the two semi-finals, as well as which half of the show they would perform in. Iceland was placed into the first semi-final, to be held on 14 May 2019, and was scheduled to perform in the second half of the show.

Once all the competing songs for the 2019 contest had been released, the running order for the semi-finals was decided by the shows' producers rather than through another draw, so that similar songs were not placed next to each other. Iceland was set to perform in position 13, following the entry from Australia and before the entry from Estonia.

The two semi-finals and the final were broadcast in Iceland on RÚV with commentary by Gísli Marteinn Baldursson. Alex Elliott also provided English commentary on RÚV 2 for the semi-finals and for the online broadcast of the final. The Icelandic spokesperson, who announced the top 12-point score awarded by the Icelandic jury during the final, was Jóhannes Haukur Jóhannesson.

Semi-final

Hatari took part in technical rehearsals on 3 and 6 May, followed by dress rehearsals on 9 and 10 May. This included the jury show on 9 May where the professional juries of each country watched and voted on the competing entries.

The Icelandic performance featured the members of Hatari dressed in rubber outfits with harnesses and chains, designed by designers Karen Briem and Andri Hrafn Unnarsson, with drummer Einar Hrafn Stefánsson placed on top of a metal globe on stage and joined by three dancers: Sólbjört Sigurðardóttir, Andrean Sigurgeirsson and Ástrós Guðjónsdóttir. The performance began with Sigurðardóttir in the globe, of which she then broke out of the main stage. The LED screens displayed red chains pulling vertically up and down. The performance also featured pyrotechnic effects. The creative director for the performance was Lee Proud, who also completed the choreography.

At the end of the show, Iceland was announced as having finished in the top 10 and subsequently qualifying for the grand final. It was later revealed that Iceland placed third in the semi-final, receiving a total of 221 points: 151 points from the televoting and 70 points from the juries.

Final 
Shortly after the first semi-final, a winners' press conference was held for the ten qualifying countries. As part of this press conference, the qualifying artists took part in a draw to determine which half of the grand final they would subsequently participate in. This draw was done in the order the countries were announced during the semi-final. Iceland was drawn to compete in the second half. Following this draw, the shows' producers decided upon the running order of the final, as they had done for the semi-finals. Iceland was subsequently placed to perform in position 17, following the entry from United Kingdom and before the entry from Estonia.

Hatari once again took part in dress rehearsals on 17 and 18 May before the final, including the jury final where the professional juries cast their final votes before the live show. The group performed a repeat of their semi-final performance during the final on 18 May. Iceland placed tenth in the final, scoring 232 points: 186 points from the televoting and 46 points from the juries. While the televoting points for Iceland were announced, members of Hatari unveiled banners displaying the Palestinian flag, which was met with loud booing throughout the arena. RÚV was later fined €5,000 by the EBU due to breaking the no-politics rule, with the broadcaster stating that they were "dissatisfied with the handling of the case and the proposed outcome" as the group's actions were their own responsibility.

Voting
Voting during the three shows involved each country awarding two sets of points from 1–8, 10 and 12: one from their professional jury and the other from televoting. Each nation's jury consisted of five music industry professionals who are citizens of the country they represent, with their names published before the contest to ensure transparency. This jury judged each entry based on: vocal capacity; the stage performance; the song's composition and originality; and the overall impression by the act. In addition, no member of a national jury was permitted to be related in any way to any of the competing acts in such a way that they cannot vote impartially and independently. The individual rankings of each jury member as well as the nation's televoting results were released shortly after the grand final.

Below is a breakdown of points awarded to Iceland and awarded by Iceland in the first semi-final and grand final of the contest, and the breakdown of the jury voting and televoting conducted during the two shows:

Points awarded to Iceland

Points awarded by Iceland

Detailed voting results
The following members comprised the Icelandic jury:
 Hrafnhildur Halldórsdóttir (jury chairperson)radio host, singer
 Óskar Einarsson
 María Ólafsdóttirsinger, represented Iceland in the 2015 contest
 drummer
 Lovísa Árnadóttircommunication manager

References

External links 
Official RÚV Eurovision site

2019
Countries in the Eurovision Song Contest 2019
Eurovision